North Hobart is a suburb of the city of Hobart, Tasmania, Australia.  As its name suggests, it lies directly north of the CBD.

The main street of North Hobart is Elizabeth Street, which extends northward from the Elizabeth Street Mall in the city, through North Hobart, and then becomes the Main Road in New Town and continues through many suburbs to Glenorchy and beyond.

The most recent median house price for North Hobart is $420,855 and the median unit price is $410,000.

Restaurant strip

Elizabeth Street (between Tasma and Federal Streets) contains many of the restaurants and cafes for which North Hobart is known. The area could be compared with Lygon Street in Melbourne, except on a much smaller scale.

Restaurants in the area include two Italian restaurants, one of which was established by and named for City of Hobart alderman Marti Zucco and two fish bars. Asian food dominates the strip with Indian, Thai, Japanese and Chinese food, all being popular. Other restaurants serve Mexican and Turkish food.

Located in North Hobart is South African restaurant Nando's; the first in the state.

Fast food outlet Hungry Jack's had their first (and for many years, only) Tasmanian store in North Hobart which opened in 1997, though it is located a block away from the restaurant strip. Subway also has a store in the area.  Local Hobart chicken takeaway chain Legs and Breasts, which has a number of stores scattered around Hobart, also has a North Hobart store. KFC also ran a small restaurant opposite the State Theatre from 1978 to 1998 but this was closed due to lack of profitability.

The Republic Bar (formerly known as The Empire Hotel), one of the many pubs in the suburb, was the first pub in Tasmania to voluntarily go "smoke-free" (ban indoor smoking). Many other venues have since followed their lead, and the state government has since implemented smoke-free laws for all pubs and clubs, which came into effect on 1 January 2006.

Services
Two colleges are located in the area - Elizabeth College, one of Hobart's four public secondary colleges, and The Friends' School, a private school for years K-12. North Hobart was also home of the former Hobart High School from 1918 to 1984 - one of the first schools in the city. The building has been preserved and used by many educational establishments over the years, and is now a Millingtons funeral home.

Other places in North Hobart include:
The historic North Hobart Post Office, which still exists in its original form.
North Hobart Oval, one of the larger sports grounds in Hobart. It is the site of the Brickfields Hiring Depot during the mid 1800s, and is now predominantly used for Australian rules football matches. The suburb is represented by the North Hobart Football Club in the Tasmanian State League.
The State Cinema, Tasmania's largest independent cinema, generally shows independent and underground films.

Redevelopment
In 2004 the area was redeveloped, including footpath widening and lining Elizabeth Street with trees. Alderman Zucco unsuccessfully proposed that the area be lined with olive trees to promote the multiculturalism that exists in the area.

References

 
Localities of City of Hobart